Allhallows is a civil parish in the Borough of Allerdale in Cumbria, England.  It contains six buildings that are recorded in the National Heritage List for England as designated listed buildings.  Of these, two are listed at Grade I, the highest of the three grades, and the others are at Grade II, the lowest grade.  The parish contains the village of Mealsgate and smaller settlements, and is otherwise rural.  The listed buildings consist of two tower houses and the former coach house of one of them, two churches, one redundant, one active, and a war memorial.


Key

Buildings

References

Citations

Sources

Lists of listed buildings in Cumbria